This is a list of Iranian rail accidents.

Timeline

20th Century 
 December 31, 1970 – Two trains collide at Ardakan, Yazd Province due to a signalman's error; a government source indicates 15 people killed, but journalists reported at least 70, with 130 injured.
 May 23, 1992 – A passenger train and freight train collided head-on along the Tehran-Ahvaz Line at the outskirts of Dorud, Lorestan, killing 26 people and injuring 28.

21st Century 
 18 February 2004 – Nishapur train disaster - Nearly 300 people were killed and the entire village of Khayyam near Nishapur, Khorasan Province, was destroyed when runaway train wagons crashed into the community in the middle of the night and exploded, resulting in Iran's deadliest rail disaster. 
 5 June 2014 – A passenger train collided with a freight train in the north of the country. Ten people are killed.
 22 July 2016 - At least 30 people were injured after a train collides with a truck at a railway crossing in Mazandaran.
 25 November 2016 – Dagham  train collision, killed 49 persons, injured 103 others in Semnan Province. 
 24 May 2020 – In Tehran, a passenger train travelling from Hamedan to Mashhad derailed in Parand, there were a total of 45 people on the train, 5 people were injured.
 22 December 2021 - A Tehran Metro train crashed into another train after passing a red signal, 22 people were injured.
 8 June 2022 – South Khorasan train derailment,  killed 22 persons and injured 86 persons in Tabas.

See also 
 List of rail accidents
 List of rail accidents by country

References 

 
Iran